Dawn Ward may refer to:
Dawn Ward (chemist), American chemist
 Dawn Ward, cast member of UK reality show The Real Housewives of Cheshire